Louis Stewart may refer to:

 Lou Stewart (1915–2002), labor leader in Washington
 Louis Stewart (guitarist) (1944–2016), Irish jazz guitarist
 Louis Beaufort Stewart (1861–1937), Canadian astronomer, civil engineer and academic